Anna Omielan (born 14 May 1993) is a former Polish Paralympic swimmer who competed in international level events. She is a double European medalist and has competed at the 2008 Summer Paralympics but did not medal.

Omielan lost her left leg aged two years old in an agricultural accident when her lower leg was cut off by a lawn mower.

References

1993 births
Living people
Sportspeople from Białystok
Paralympic swimmers of Poland
Swimmers at the 2008 Summer Paralympics
Medalists at the World Para Swimming European Championships
Polish female freestyle swimmers
Polish female butterfly swimmers
20th-century Polish women
21st-century Polish women